An online employment screening test (sometimes called a pre-employment test or online screening interview) is a part of the hiring, or recruitment, process. It is a type of employment testing that typically accompanies or follows a job application, while preceding a phone interview or formal job interview.

Employment screening tests are typically forms or questionnaires composed of test or interview-type questions. The questions may be multiple choice, yes/no, rank-order, or open-ended. The questions are used to gauge job applicants’ knowledge, skills, attitudes, and/or personality before conducting a phone screening or in-person interview.

Performance on the test determines whether the job applicant moves on to the next round of the interview process.

Sample questions
 Do you have experience using Microsoft Office?
 Are you able to work 9 to 5 in Burbank, California?
 On a scale of 1 to 5, how would your previous employer rate your work ethic?
 On a scale of 1 to 5, how good are you at working with others?
 Explain a time when you received excellent customer service.

In use
Large employers like Walmart, McDonald's, and Burger King use pre-employment tests. Some employers have taken to using these online quizzes in response to the growing number of applicants resulting from a weak economy. Some say they use the online screening tests to see if job seekers who have been out of work for a while are still able to perform certain skills.

References

E-recruitment